Malaka Regency is a regency in the province of East Nusa Tenggara, Indonesia. The regency was established on 14 December 2012, comprising twelve districts which had formerly been the southern part of Belu Regency.

The area now comprising the new Regency had 164,134 inhabitants at the 2010 Census, which had risen to 183,900 at the 2020 Census; the official estimate as at mid 2021 was 197,022. The capital of the regency is the town of Betun.

Administration 
The new Malaka Regency is composed of twelve districts (kecamatan), tabulated below with their areas and populations at the 2010 Census and the 2020 Census, together with the official estimate as at mid 2021. The table also includes the location of the district headquarters, the number of administrative villages (rural desa and urban kelurahan) in each district, and its postal code.

Radio AM/FM 
In this newly established regency, there are 4 radio stations, which are all from Atambua, as help from RRI Atambua

Note: These radios only has mono channel in the regency.

References

Regencies of East Nusa Tenggara